Tropical Nights or similar may refer to:

 Tropical Nights (1928 film), an American silent film directed by Elmer Clifton
 Tropical Nights (1931 film), an American German-language film directed by Leo Mittler
 Tropical Nights (album), by Liza Minnelli, 1977
 tropical night, in some countries, a night when the air temperature stays at or above 20°C